"Świt" (from Polish: dawn) is a song composed and recorded in Polish by Daria Zawiałow, Błażej Król and Igor Walaszek (aka Igo) for 2020 Męskie Granie concert tour. It was released on July 1, 2020. Music video of the song, directed by Daniel Jaroszek, reached 15 million views on the YouTube as of November 2020.

Chart performance

Weekly charts

Personnel 
 vocals: Daria Zawiałow, Błażej Król, Igor Walaszek

References 

2020 songs
2020 singles
Polish-language songs
Number-one singles in Poland
Pop songs